Tabiti was the Scythian goddess of the primordial fire which alone existed before the creation of the universe and was the basic essence and the source of all creation. She was the most venerated of all Scythian deities.

Name

History
The connections of her name to fire and warmth, as well as her role as the primeval fire attest of the role of Tabiti as a primordial sovereign deity of fire derived from the common fire-deity of the Indo-Europeans, whose iterations included the Greek Hestia, and the Vedic Agni among the Indo-Aryans, and Atar among the more southern Iranian peoples. Tabiti was thus similar to the Vedic Agni and the Greek Hestia, therefore being connected to the common Iranian cult and concept of fire, although she belonged to an older period in the development of Indo-Iranian religion compared to the other Iranian peoples and the Indo-Aryans, among whom she had been respectively replaced by the male fire-gods Ātar and Agni, making her the only attested female Indo-Iranian fire-deity.

Herodotus of Halicarnassus equates Tabiti with the Greek goddess of the hearth, Hestia, and lists Tabiti at the head of the Scythian pantheon, which might be a reflection of the role of the fire-deity among the Indo-European peoples, and parallels the Greek tradition of beginning and ending every sacrificial rite with the sacrifice to Hestia, and every appeal to the gods starting by mentioning her name; another parallel is found in the Indo-Aryan Rigveda, which begins and ends with a hymn addressed to Agni; thus, the supreme position of Tabiti in the list of Scythian gods reflected her position in hymns to the gods pronounced during Scythian sacrifices and rituals.

Cult

Functions
Tabiti was the primordial fire which alone existed before the creation of the universe and was the basic essence and the source of all creation, and from her were born Api (the Earth) and Papaios (Heaven). This attests of the paramount role of the fire-deity in the Iranian pantheon as an omnipresent element, and was a concept which was also present among the Indo-Aryan pantheon, where Agni was the fire which could be found throughout the Cosmos and which permeated the whole Universe, including the worlds of the humans and of the gods.

As a goddess of the Hearth, Tabiti was the patron of society, the state and families who protected the family and the clan, and, as a symbol of supreme authority, she was assigned the superior position over the other gods through her role as the guardian of the king, due to which as well as her to link to the common Iranian cult of fire, she was connected to the importance of fire and of royal hearths in Iranian religions. As the guardian of the royal hearth, Tabiti therefore ensured the well-being of the tribe - an oath by the royal hearths was considered the most sacred and breaking it was believed to cause the king's illness and was punished by death.

The hearths of Tabiti
The "hearths" of Tabiti were likely the flaming gold objects which fell from the sky in the Scythian genealogical myth and of which the Scythian king was the trustee while Tabiti herself in turn was the protector of the king and the royal hearth, thus creating a strong bond between Tabiti and the Scythian king, who might have been seen as an intermediary between the goddess and the people, with any offence to the royal  being considered as affecting the whole tribe and as having to be averted at any cost.

Iconography
Due to being a deity representing an abstract notion of fire and divine bliss, Tabiti was rarely depicted in Scythian art, but was instead represented by the fireplace, which constituted the sacral centre of any community, from the family to the tribe.

See also
 Scythian religion

References

Sources

 
 
 

 
 
 
 
 

Scythian mythology
Fire goddesses
Domestic and hearth deities
Household deities
Mother goddesses
Legendary progenitors